Greta Masserano (born 16 December 1994) is an Italian lightweight rower bronze medal winner at senior level at the World Rowing Championships.

Achievements

References

External links
 
 Greta Masserano at Italian Rowing Federation

1994 births
Living people
Italian female rowers
World Rowing Championships medalists for Italy